This discography documents the releases of albums and singles by Aretha Franklin. Widely regarded as the "Queen of Soul", she has sold over 75 million records worldwide, making her one of the best-selling R&B female artists of all time. Billboard ranks her as the 34th Greatest Artist of all time. Franklin has scored 73 entries on the Billboard Hot 100, the most among women for nearly 50 years until Nicki Minaj passed her in 2017. Billboard listed her as the 41st Top Gospel Artist of the 2010s. She has accumulated 20 No. 1 hits on Billboard's Hot R&B/Hip-Hop Songs.

Amazing Grace remains the biggest-selling live gospel album of all time, being certified 2× Platinum in the US. According to RIAA database, Franklin has sold 16.5 million albums and singles in the US (based on certifications).

She is ranked first among female vocalists with the most Billboard chart hits during the rock era (1955–2012) with a total of 88 according to Joel Whitburn's Record Research. In total cumulative weeks, Franklin is the fifth most successful female artist on the Billboard 200 with a total of 995 cumulative weeks on the chart behind Adele, Madonna, Barbra Streisand and Taylor Swift.

Albums

Studio albums

Live albums

Soundtrack albums

Compilation albums

Singles

The JVB era (1956–1959)

Notes
 "Never Grow Old" was reissued by Checker Records in 1957, 1968 and 1973.
 "Precious Lord (Part 1)" was reissued by Checker Records in 1960 and 1969.

The Columbia era (1960–1966)

The following singles were released or re-released after Franklin left Columbia.

The Atlantic era (1967–1979)

The Arista era (1980–2007)

The final years (2008–2018)

Billboard Year-End performances

Other appearances

See also
List of number-one hits (United States)
List of artists who reached number one in the United States
List of number-one dance hits (United States)
List of artists who reached number one on the U.S. dance chart

References

External links

Discography
Discographies of American artists
Pop music discographies
Rhythm and blues discographies
Soul music discographies